Alysia Lefau-Fakaosilea (born 5 November 2000) is an Australian rugby union player. She has represented Australia at sevens rugby at the Olympic and Commonwealth Games. She is the niece of Australian rugby player Will Skelton.

Lefau-Fakaosilea won a gold medal with the Australian sevens team at the 2022 Commonwealth Games in Birmingham. She was a member of the Australian team that won the 2022 Sevens Rugby World Cup held in Cape Town, South Africa in September 2022.

References

2000 births
Living people
Australian female rugby sevens players
Commonwealth Games gold medallists for Australia
Commonwealth Games medallists in rugby sevens
Rugby sevens players at the 2022 Commonwealth Games
Medallists at the 2022 Commonwealth Games